The  Ranikhola is a river in Sikkim, India, that flows near the state capital Gangtok. It is a tributary of the Teesta River. The Mangar queen committed suicide on this river after the death of her husband at Mangarzong in 1642, so this river is named Ranikhola. Ranikhola originates from Himalayas and flows below Gangtok where it is joined by Ratey River and flows towards Ranipool where it is again joined by another river called Roro River, than the river borders villages of Gangtok Subdivision in Gangtok District and Pakyong Subdivision of Pakyong District. National Highway 10 runs parallel to Rani khola from Ranipool to Singtam and then the river ultimately flows into River Teesta at Singtam.

Hydropower project
The first hydropower project commissioned in Sikkim was a micro-hydel on Rani Khola below Gangtok in 1927. This one had an installed capacity of 50 kW.

References

Rivers of Sikkim
Rivers of India
Tributaries of the Teesta River